Dressing Up for the Carnival is a short story collection published in 2000 by  Canadian author Carol Shields, which depicts 12 characters who live their lives through illusions.  The Carnival is a metaphor for life, and "dressing up" represents the stigmas each of the characters try to fit into.

Characters

The first character we get introduced to is Tamara. Tamara loves dressing up. She is a clerk-receptionist for the Youth Employment Bureau where she lives.

The second character we meet is Roger. Roger is 30 years old, and is of medium height. He is described to us as a burly divorcee. Roger is employed by the Gas Board in the place where he lives. In the story he is described as holding a mango and going to work, and while he is doing so, he is creating symbols.

The third character or characters introduced in the story are the Borden sisters, Karen and Sue. The Borden sisters arrived back in town approximately a month ago from their skiing trip in Happy Valley. The Borden sisters both look and express the fact that they have recently been skiing. Much attention in this story is paid to the tags on the Borden sisters jackets that read: "I SKIED HAPPY MOUNTAIN".

The fourth character in this story is Wanda, an awkward woman who works at a bank under the supervision of Mr. Wishcourt, the bank manager. Mr. Wishcourt has recently had a baby boy, for whom he buys a baby carriage. Mr. Wishcourt asks Wanda to take the baby carriage to his house during work, because it will not fit in the back of his car. Wanda agrees, and while she is taking the carriage to Mr. Wishcourt's house, she feels as if she and the carriage are a single entity.

References

2000 short story collections
Books by Carol Shields
Canadian short story collections